A slipper is "a semi-closed type of indoor/outdoor shoe". 

Slipper may also refer to:

Footwear
Ballet shoe
Flip-flops

Other
Slipper clutch, a type of clutch designed for motorcycles
Slipper Island, an island off the coast of New Zealand's North Island
Slipper lobster, a family of crustaceans
Operation Slipper, the Australian Defence Force (ADF) contribution to the war in Afghanistan

People with the surname
Jack Slipper (1924–2005), British police officer
James Slipper (born 1989), Australian rugby union player
Peter Slipper (born 1950), Australian politician

See also
Glass slipper (disambiguation)
Slipperiness
Slippering
Slippery (disambiguation)